British Somaliland, officially the Somaliland Protectorate, was a British protectorate in present-day Somaliland. During its existence, the territory was bordered by Italian Somalia, French Somali Coast and Abyssinia (temporarily Italian Ethiopia). From 1940 to 1941, it was occupied by the Italians and was part of Italian East Africa.

On 26 June 1960, British Somaliland declared independence as the State of Somaliland. Five days later, on 1 July 1960, the State of Somaliland voluntarily united with the Trust Territory of Somalia (the former Italian Somalia) to form the Somali Republic. The government of Somaliland, a self-declared sovereign state that is internationally recognised as an autonomous region of Somalia, regards itself as the successor state to British Somaliland.

History

Treaties and establishment

In the late 19th century, the United Kingdom signed agreements with the Gadabuursi, Issa, Habr Awal, Garhajis, Habr Je'lo and Warsangeli clans establishing a protectorate. The British garrisoned the protectorate from Aden and administered it from their British India colony until 1898. British Somaliland was then administered by the Foreign Office until 1905 and afterwards by the Colonial Office.

Generally, the British did not have much interest in the resource-barren region. The stated purposes of the establishment of the protectorate were to "secure a supply market, check the traffic in slaves, and to exclude the interference of foreign powers." The British principally viewed the protectorate as a source for supplies of meat for their British Indian outpost in Aden through the maintenance of order in the coastal areas and protection of the caravan routes from the interior. Hence, the region's nickname of "Aden's butcher's shop". Colonial administration during this period did not extend administrative infrastructure beyond the coast, and contrasted with the more interventionist colonial experience of Italian Somalia.

Dervish Uprising

Beginning in 1899, the British were forced to expend considerable human and military capital to contain a decades-long resistance movement mounted by the Dervish resistance movement. The movement was led by Sayyid Mohammed Abdullah Hassan, a Somali religious leader referred to colloquially by the British as the "Mad Mullah". Repeated military expeditions were unsuccessfully launched against Hassan and his Dervishes before World War I.

On 9 August 1913, the Somaliland Camel Constabulary suffered a serious defeat at the Battle of Dul Madoba at the hands of the Dervishes. Hassan had already evaded several attempts to capture him. At Dul Madoba, his forces killed or wounded 57 members of the 110-man Constabulary unit, including the British commander, Colonel Richard Corfield.

In 1914, the British created the Somaliland Camel Corps to assist in maintaining order in British Somaliland.

In 1920, the British launched their fifth and final expedition against Hassan and his followers. Employing the then-new technology of military aircraft, the British finally managed to quell Hassan's twenty-year-long struggle. The British tricked Hassan into preparing for an official visit, then launched bombing raids in the city of Taleh where most of his troops were stationed, causing the mullah to retreat into the desert. Hassan and his Dervish supporters fled to the Ogaden, where Hassan died in 1921.

Somaliland Camel Corps

The Somaliland Camel Corps, also referred to as the Somali Camel Corps, was a unit of the British Army based in British Somaliland. It lasted from the early 20th century until 1944. The troopers of the Somaliland Camel Corps had a distinctive dress. It was based on the standard British Army khaki drill but included a knitted woollen pullover and drill patches on the shoulders. Shorts were worn with woollen socks on puttees and "chaplis", boots or bare feet. Equipment consisted of leather ammunition bandolier and a leather waist belt. The officers wore pith helmets and khaki drill uniforms. Other ranks wore a "kullah" with "puggree" which ended in a long tail which hung down the back. A "chaplis" is typically a colourful sandal. A "kullah" is a type of cap. A "puggree" is typically a strip of cloth wound around the upper portion of a hat or helmet, particularly a pith helmet, and falling down from behind to act as a shade for the back of the neck.

British Somaliland 1920–1930

Following the defeat of the Dervish resistance, the two fundamental goals of British policy in British Somaliland were the preservation of stability and the economic self-sufficiency of the protectorate. The second goal remained particularly elusive because of local resistance to taxation that might have been used to support the protectorate's administration. By the 1930s, the British presence had extended to other parts of British Somaliland. Growth in commercial trade motivated some livestock herders to subsequently leave the pastoral economy and settle in urban areas. Customs taxes also helped pay for British India's patrol of Somalia's Red Sea Coast.

Among military units in British Somaliland during the interwar period was a battalion of the Indian Army 4th Bombay Grenadiers.

Italian invasion

In August 1940, during the East African campaign in World War II, British Somaliland was invaded by Italy. The few British forces that were present attempted to defend the main road to Berbera, but were dislodged from their positions and retreated after losing the Battle of Tug Argan. During this period, the British rounded up soldiers and governmental officials to evacuate them from the territory through Berbera. In total, 7,000 people, including civilians, were evacuated. The Somalis serving in the Somaliland Camel Corps were given the choice of evacuation or disbandment; the majority chose to remain and were allowed to retain their arms.

In March 1941, after a six-month Italian occupation, British forces recaptured the protectorate during Operation Appearance. The final remnants of the Italian guerrilla movement discontinued all resistance in British Somaliland by the autumn of 1943.

1945 Sheikh Bashir Rebellion

The 1945 Sheikh Bashir Rebellion was a rebellion waged by tribesmen of the Habr Je'lo clan in the cities of Burao and Erigavo in the former British Somaliland protectorate against British authorities in July 1945 led by Sheikh Bashir, a Somali religious leader belonging to the Yeesif sub-division.

On 2 July, Sheikh Hamza collected 25 of his followers in the town of Wadamago and transported them on a lorry to the vicinity of Burao, where he distributed arms to half of his followers. On the evening of 3 July the group entered Burao and opened fire on the police guard of the central prison in the city, which was filled with prisoners arrested for previous demonstrations. The group also attacked the house of the district commissioner of Burao District, Major Chambers, resulting in the death of Major Chamber's police guard before escaping to Bur Dhab, a strategic mountain south-east of Burao, where Sheikh Bashir's small unit occupied a fort and took up a defensive position in anticipation of a British counterattack.

The British campaign against Sheikh Hamza troops proved abortive after several defeats as his forces kept moving from place to place and avoiding any permanent location. No sooner had the expedition left the area, than the news traveled fast among the Somali nomads across the plain. The war had exposed the British administration to humiliation. The government came to a conclusion that another expedition against him would be useless; that they must build a railway, make roads and effectively occupy the whole of the protectorate, or else abandon the interior completely. The latter course was decided upon, and during the first months of 1945, the advance posts were withdrawn and the British administration confined to the coast town of Berbera.

Sheikh Bashir settled many disputes among the tribes in the vicinity, which kept them from raiding each other. He was generally thought to settle disputes through the use of Islamic Sharia and gathered around him a strong following.

Sheikh Bashir sent a message to religious figures in the town of Erigavo and called on them to revolt and join the rebellion he led. The religious leaders as well as the people of Erigavo heeded his call, and mobilized a substantial number of people in Erigavo armed with rifles and spears and staged a revolt. The British authorities responded rapidly and severely, sending reinforcements to the town and opening fire on the armed mobs in two "local actions" as well as arresting minor religious leaders in the town.

The British administration recruited Indian and South African troops, led by police general James David, to fight against Sheikh Bashir and had intelligence plans to capture him alive. The British authorities mobilized a police force, and eventually on 7 July found Sheikh Bashir and his unit in defensive positions behind their fortifications in the mountains of Bur Dhab. After clashes Sheikh Bashir and his second-in-command, Alin Yusuf Ali, nicknamed Qaybdiid, were killed. A third rebel was wounded and was captured along with two other rebels. The rest fled the fortifications and dispersed. On the British side the police general leading the British troops as well as a number of Indian and South African troops perished in the clashes, and a policeman was injured.

Despite the death of Sheikh Hamza and his followers resistance against British authorities continued in Somaliland, especially in Erigavo where his death stirred further resistance in the town and the town of Badhan and lead to attacks on British colonial troops throughout the district and the seizing of arms from the rural constabulary.

The British authorities was not finished with the rebels even after most of them had died and continued its counter-insurgency campaign. The authorities had quickly learned the names and identities of all the followers of Sheikh Bashir and tried to convince the locals to turn them in. When they refused, the authorities invoked the Collective Punishment Ordinance, under which the authorities seized and impounded a total of 6,000 camels owned by the Habr Je'lo, the clan that Sheikh Bashir belonged to. The British authorities made the return of the livestock dependent on the turning over and arrest of the escaped rebels. The remaining rebels were subsequently found and arrested, and transported to the Saad-ud-Din archipelago, off the coast of Zeila in northwestern Somaliland.

Independence and union with the Trust Territory of Somaliland

In 1947, the entire budget for the administration of the British Somaliland protectorate was only £213,139.

In May 1960, the British Government stated that it would be prepared to grant independence to the then Somaliland protectorate. The Legislative Council of British Somaliland passed a resolution in April 1960 requesting independence. The legislative councils of the territory agreed to this proposal.

In April 1960, leaders of the two territories met in Mogadishu and agreed to form a unitary state. An elected president was to be head of state. Full executive powers would be held by a prime minister answerable to an elected National Assembly of 123 members representing the two territories.

On 26 June 1960, the British Somaliland protectorate gained independence as the State of Somaliland before uniting five days later with the Trust Territory of Somalia to form the Somali Republic (Somalia) on 1 July 1960.

The legislature appointed the speaker Hagi Bashir Ismail Yousuf as first President of the Somali National Assembly and, the same day, Aden Abdullah Osman Daar become President of the Somali Republic.

Somaliland
In 1991, after a bloody civil war for independence in the northern part of Somali Democratic Republic, the area which formerly encompassed British Somaliland declared independence. In May 1991, the formation of the "Republic of Somaliland" was proclaimed, with the local government regarding it as the successor to the former British Somaliland as well as to the State of Somaliland. However, the Somaliland region's self-declared independence remains unrecognised by any country.

Postage stamps

References

 
States and territories established in 1884
1884 establishments in Somalia
Somaliland, British
Somaliland
History of Somaliland
1960 disestablishments in Somalia
Somaliland
Somaliland–United Kingdom relations
Somaliland, British
States and territories disestablished in 1960